Elections to the House of Representatives in Missouri for the 23rd Congress were held August 5, 1832 and August 6, 1833 for two Representatives.  Unusually, rather than a single election for both seats, the second seat was elected a year after the first.

Background
In the 22nd Congress, Missouri had been represented by a single Representative elected at-large.  With reapportionment following the Census of 1830, Missouri's representation increased to 2 representatives.  Going into the election, Missouri was represented by William H. Ashley (J), who'd been elected in a special election held in 1831.

1832 election

1833 election

References

1832
Missouri
Missouri
United States House of Representatives
United States House of Representatives